Morrison's dragonet (Synchiropus morrisoni) is a species of dragonet. It is native to the southwest Pacific Ocean from Japan to Australia  ant eastwards to the Marshall Islands and Fiji.

Etymology
The specific name honours J.P.E. Morrison (1906-1983), the U.S. malacologist who was curator of molluscs at United States National Museum and who spent the summers of 1947 and 1948 at Bikini Atoll.

Description
Soft dorsal rays branched. In males the first dorsal fin is much taller than the second, and in females it is shorter. Colour is a mottled red with variably sizes white spots and a dark brown blotch covering at least half of the base of the pectoral. In males, the first dorsal fin has narrow bars edged with light blue, and the lower head and front of the body has blue dots.

Distribution
Japan to Australia and eastwards to the Marshall Islands and Fiji.

Habitat

References

External links
 

M
Taxa named by Leonard Peter Schultz
Fish described in 1960
Fish of East Asia
Fish of Japan
Fish of Oceania